Sulfur difluoride is an inorganic compound with the chemical formula SF2. It can be generated by the reaction of sulfur dichloride and potassium fluoride or mercury(II) fluoride at low pressures:

SCl2 + 2 KF → SF2 + 2 KCl
SCl2 + HgF2 → SF2 + HgCl2

The F−S−F bond angle is 98°, and the length of S−F bond is 159 pm. The compound is highly unstable, decomposing to FSSF3.  This unsymmetrical isomer of S2F4 is proposed to arise via insertion of SF2 into the S−F bond of a second molecule SF2:

It can also be formed from oxygen difluoride and hydrogen sulfide:
OF2 + H2S → SF2 + H2O

References 

Sulfur(II) compounds
Fluorides
Sulfur fluorides